Yong Seung Cho (born September 18, 1949) is a South Korean educator and mathematician. He completed a Ph.D. in mathematics in 1987 at the University of Chicago. His research interests include geometric topology, Yang-Mills Theory, Seiberg-Witten Theory, Gromov-Witten Theory, and Quantum cohomology of symplectic manifolds. His teaching career includes Chungbuk National University, Kyungpook National University, Brandeis University, and Ewha Womans University.  Currently he teaches at Sungkyunkwan University as Invited Professor.
In 2003, he was elected as President of the Korean Mathematical Society (KMS), and at the position, he played a pivotal role in establishing the National Institute for Mathematical Sciences (NIMS) in South Korea, the first national mathematical research center directly funded by the South Korean government. In 2005, he was selected as the first President of NIMS, and immediately began to set-up fundamental foundation of the NIMS to be innovative hub of the mathematical researches contributing to South Korea's overall scientific and industrial competitiveness.

Education and career
Cho attended Kyungpook National University for bachelor and master programs in mathematics, and earned a doctorate in 1987 from the University of Chicago under the academic direction of Melvin Rothenburg, Karen Uhlenbeck, and Shmuel Weinberger.  He became an assistant professor at Brandeis University in 1987, and moved to Ewha Womans University in Seoul as a full professor in 1989.  He taught and researched at Ewha Womans University until retirement in 2015.
Image:

Mathematical work
Cho has been a pure scientist for his entire life. He has researched on Yang-Mills Theory, Seiberg-Witten Theory, Gromov-Witten Theory, and Quantum cohomology of symplectic manifolds. Besides, he achieved a remarkable result on Big-Bang String Theory, [4][5][7] that is, as the early universe he used the string theory with Einstein's general relativity and Morse Theory to verify the expansion, shear, and rotation of the universe.  Professor Cho's result was co-worked with physicist Professor ST Hong, so it is named "Cho-Hong String Theory." Also Cho initiated the Gromov-Witten type invariant, quantum type cohomology, and Floer type cohomology on cosymplectic manifolds, and induced an Arnold type theorem on odd dimensional manifolds.  Professor Cho has published more than 130 academic research papers, and more than 15 text books on Topology, and has delivered more than 230 special lectures at various international conferences and scholarly events, including American Mathematical Society's Annual Conference and Harvard Math Colloquium Lecture Series.

Service
Cho has been active in advancing South Korean mathematical research capabilities and national science development by holding several positions. Cho held President position of the Korean Mathematical Society (KMS, January 2003 – December 2004), and during this positionCho played a critical role in establishing the National Institute for Mathematical Sciences (NIMS) in South Korea, the first national mathematical research center directly funded by the South Korean government. Cho became the first President of NIMS (2005–2008) and set-up foundation of the NIMS to be innovative hub of the mathematical researches contributing to the Korea's overall mathematical researches and scientific competitiveness. Professor Cho also held Council member position of Presidential Council on National Science and Technology; led a math mentorship for ROK Science Gifted Student Academy; and wrote science columns as editorial writer for Kookmin Ilbo and other national newspapers. Cho's four books are awarded as the Best Books of the Year by South Korea's National Academy of Sciences, in recognition of creative works that help the public understanding in sciences (2019 Topology, 2019 Differentiable Manifolds, 2011 Algebraic Topology, and 2002 Topology on Differentiable Manifolds).

Cho has been one of executive editors of Journal of Korean Mathematical Society (KMS) and Bulletin of KMS. Cho has been journal reviewers of American Mathematical Society (AMS) and European Mathematical Society (EMS).

Awards and honors
Cho has received several honors and awards, including
-"The Presidential Honors, President of South Korea Park Geun-hye (대한민국 대통령 옥조근정훈장, 2015),"

-"The 10th Ewha Academic Award (이화학술상, 2014)",

-"Mathematics Award, Microsoft Korea Inc. (마이크로소프트 수학상, 2003),"

-"Ewha Womans University "Award for Outstanding Science and Technology Papers,(이화여대 최고우수논문상 수상, 2001)",

-"Korean Federation of Science and Technology Societies (한국과학기술총연합회 우수논문상, 1992)"

-Professor Cho had been university fellow at the University of Chicago during his entire graduate studies in 1984–1987.

Image:

Personal life
Cho married his wife, Su Nam (Kim) Cho, in January 1980. They had two sons together: Hyunbae Cho and Ihnbae Cho.  Wife Su-Nam Kim Cho was adjunct professor at Sookmyung Women's University's Graduate School of International Service (GSIS) and worked at the U.S. Embassy in Seoul; both sons are Doctors of Dental Surgery(DDS) in the United States - Hyunbae is from New York University DDS, and Ihnbae is from the University of Southern California DDS. First son Hyunbae married Eunmee (Lee) Cho (USC DDS) and have two children Gia and Sua.

Notes and references

External links
 Yong Seung Cho's homepage - His homepage contains CV, list of published journals, books, articles, presentations, and advisees.

1949 births
Living people
20th-century South Korean mathematicians
21st-century South Korean mathematicians
Kyungpook National University alumni
University of Chicago alumni
Brandeis University faculty
Academic staff of Chungbuk National University
Academic staff of Ewha Womans University
Academic staff of Kyungpook National University
People from Suncheon